Fogtrein, is the name given to a family of Brazilian research rockets created jointly by the Air Force Command (COMAer) and Avibras.

The rockets are used for testing, qualification and training of teams in the Alcântara Launch Center (CLA) and the Barreira do Inferno Launch Center (CLBI).

These vehicles are designed to be launched in adverse conditions such as high salinity, winds up to 10 m / s and rain up to 10 mm / h .  All models will admit payloads (5 kg to 30 kg), with electric networks and telemetry equipment, along experiments of interest in the academic and scientific community.

Models

Basic Training Rocket (FTB)
Mission: Model for operational training of a Launch Center, in isolation, without participation of the remote station for redundant monitoring vehicle, with telemetry in S band and apogee greater than 30 km.

 Stages: Single-stage
 Status : In service.
 Height : 3.05 m
 Diameter : 12.7 cm
 Mass : 67.8 kg
 Payload : 5 kg
 Thrust at launch:
 Apogee : 30 km
 Premiere : August 10, 2009
 Last: November 7, 2012
 Released: 26 (in August 2014)

Launches
01 - 10.08.2009 - Alcantara Space Center
02 - 13.08.2009 - Alcantara Space Center
03 - 20.10.2009 - Centro de Lancamento da Barreira do Inferno
04 - 21.10.2009 - Centro de Lancamento da Barreira do Inferno
05 - 25.02.2010 - Centro de Lancamento da Barreira do Inferno
06 - 27.04.2010 - Alcantara Space Center
07 - 29.04.2010 - Centro de Lancamento da Barreira do Inferno
08 - 26.07.2010 - Alcantara Space Center
09 - 20.09.2010 - Alcantara Space Center
10 - 27.04.2011 - Centro de Lancamento da Barreira do Inferno
11 - 16.06.2011 - Alcantara Space Center
12 - 17.06.2011 - Alcantara Space Center
13 - 20.10.2011 - Centro de Lancamento da Barreira do Inferno
14 - 14.03.2012 - Alcantara Space Center
15 - 29.03.2012 - Centro de Lancamento da Barreira do Inferno
16 - 21.05.2012 - Alcantara Space Center
17 - 29.05.2012 - Alcantara Space Center
18 - 21.06.2012 - Centro de Lancamento da Barreira do Inferno
19 - 08.08.2012 - Alcantara Space Center
20 - 19.09.2012 - Centro de Lancamento da Barreira do Inferno
21 - 27.09.2012 - Alcantara Space Center
22 - 31.10.2012 - Alcantara Space Center
23 - 07.11.2012 - Alcantara Space Center
24 - 13.03.2013 - Centro de Lancamento da Barreira do Inferno
25 - 23.05.2013 - Alcantara Space Center
26 - 08.08.2013 - Alcantara Space Center
27 - 12.03.2014 - Alcantara Space Center
28 - 28.08.2014 - Centro de Lancamento da Barreira do Inferno
29 - 02.10.2014 - Centro de Lancamento da Barreira do Inferno
30 - 10.12.2014 - Centro de Lancamento da Barreira do Inferno
31 - 19.06.2015 - Centro de Lancamento da Barreira do Inferno
32 - 27.08.2015 - Alcantara Space Center

Intermediate Training Rocket (FTI)
Mission: Model for operational training of a Launch Center, in isolation, without participation of the remote station for redundant monitoring vehicle, with telemetry in S-band, C-band transponders, flight termination, and height above 60 km.

 Stages: Single-stage
 Status : In service.
 Height : 5.4 m
 Diameter : 30 cm
 Mass : 490 kg
 Payload : 30 kg
 Thrust at launch:
 Apogee : 60 km
 Premiere : August 3, 2010
 Last:
 Released: 8 (on 2013)

Launches
01 - 03.08.2010  - CLBI
02 - 30.09.2010  - CLA
03 - 26.05.2011  - CLA
04 - 27.05.2011  - CLA
05 - 31.08.2011  - CLA - failure
06 - 02.09.2011  - CLA 
07 - 13.11.2012  - CLA - Operação Tangará I
08 - 29.11.2012  - CLA
09 - 13.06.2013  - CLA
10 - 26.06.2013  - CLBI
11 - 09.05.2014  - CLA - Operação Águia I
12 - 21.08.2014  - CLA
13 - 31.10.2015  - CLA - Operação São Lourenço

Advanced Training Rocket (FTA)

Mission: Model for operational training on two launch centers, one being responsible for the launch and the other for remote monitoring of vehicle and payloads, with telemetry in S-band, C-band transponders, flight termination, and height exceeding 160 km.

 Stages: Two-stages
 Location : To be developed.
 Apogee : 100 km (planned)

References 

Sounding rockets of Brazil
Space program of Brazil
Space programme of Argentina